The IRB Spirit of Rugby Award was an award that was previously presented by the IRB at their annual IRB Awards.

Recipients

References

External links 

 World Rugby Awards

World Rugby Awards